Rogério Ceni is a retired Brazilian footballer who played as a goalkeeper for São Paulo FC during 22 years (1993–2015), totalizing 1237 appearances. In addition, having scored 131 goals, he has been recognized by Guinness World Records as the professional goalkeeper to have scored the most goals in football history.

List of all goals

Following, is the list with all 131 goals scored by Rogério Ceni:

Farewell game 

On December 11, 2015, a festive game was held between the world champion teams of São Paulo (1992–93, 2005) as a farewell to Rogério Ceni. He scored one of the goals, in addition to having played for about 20 minutes as a line-player.

Overall 

Following is the main statiscs about Rogério Ceni career.

Summary

Penalty kick goals 69
Free kick goals 61
Indirect free kick goals 1
Result in matches where Rogério's scored 92 Wins, 23 Draws, 9 Loses

Goals awarded by opponents

Goals by stadium

Goals by tournament

Goals by year

External links
Rogério Ceni's all goals (Globo Esporte) 
Rogério Ceni at Soccerway

See also

List of goalscoring goalkeepers

References 

Career achievements of association football players
São Paulo FC
+
Association football records and statistics
Association football player non-biographical articles